Seven Society most often refers to:

 Seven Society - a secret society at the University of Virginia
 Seven Society, Order of the Crown & Dagger - a secret society at the College of William & Mary

Seven Society may also refer to:

 Society of Seven - the variety troupe/showband

See also
 Mystical Seven (Missouri) - a secret society at the University of Missouri
 Mystical Seven (Wesleyan) - an intercollegiate fraternity at Wesleyan University